A Far Off Place (aka Far Off Place and Kalahari) is a 1993 American adventure drama film based on Laurens van der Post's works A Far Off Place (1974) and its prequel, A Story Like the Wind (1972). It stars Reese Witherspoon, Ethan Randall, Jack Thompson and Maximilian Schell. The plot concerns three young teenagers who must cross the Kalahari Desert to safety when their parents are murdered by a poacher.

A Far Off Place was filmed in Namibia and Zimbabwe from May to September 1992.

Plot 
Against his wishes, spoiled New York City teen Harry Winslow accompanies his father to Africa's Kalahari Desert to spend time with family acquaintances Paul and Elizabeth Parker. He clashes with the Parkers’ spirited 14-year-old daughter Nonnie, who wants to follow in her dad's footsteps as a wildlife commissioner fighting Africa's elephant poachers. 

That night, Nonnie and the family dog, Hintza, sneak out of the house to meet her bushman friend, Xhabbo. Harry follows them to a cave, where they spend the night helping Xhabbo recover his strength after he is attacked by a leopard.

At dawn, Nonnie returns to the house to discover that her parents and Harry's father have been murdered for investigating the export of ivory, a poaching operation secretly run by Paul Parker's associate, John Ricketts. Nonnie hides from the poachers but Ricketts realizes Nonnie and Harry are missing. 

Nonnie manages to grab explosives and attaches them to the bottom of the poachers' truck, killing several of Ricketts’ men. She flees to the cave and Xhabbo advises them to “follow the wind” by heading west across the Kalahari Desert. On the edge of the desert, Xhabbo communicates with a herd of elephants and convinces them to cover their tracks by following behind. Harry is furious to learn they have 2,000 kilometers to travel before reaching the seaport of Karlstown, but Nonnie remains optimistic.

Meanwhile, the Parkers’ close friend, Colonel Mopani Theron, learns of the attack. Unaware of Ricketts' involvement, he orders Ricketts to lead an aerial search party to find the missing children. Harry attempts to flag down an approaching plane, thinking they are being rescued, but Nonnie warns they could be poachers and says they should hide. 

Harry stuffs their clothes with straw to make fake decoy bodies which they place in the sand. In hiding, the kids watch in horror as the plane passengers gun down the straw bodies. Nonnie sees it was Ricketts.

Over the next two months, the runaways dig up plant roots for sustenance, and Xhabbo teaches Harry how to speak his native language and hunt gemsbok. Col. Theron remains convinced that the Parkers’ death was a corporate conspiracy and continues his tireless search for the exporters’ store of elephant tusks, which he believes will lead him to the murderer.

Nonnie and Harry are forced to stop their journey when Xhabbo gets stung by a scorpion. While wandering in search of water, Nonnie collapses in the sand. Hearing the hum of Ricketts’ approaching helicopter, Nonnie and Xhabbo weakly thump their chests in the spiritual Bushman practice of “tapping,” summoning a sandstorm that forces Ricketts to flee.

Unaware they are only a few yards away from the Atlantic coast, the three youngsters fall unconscious and awaken in a Karlstown hospital. There, Nonnie is reunited with Col. Theron and informs him that Ricketts was responsible for her parents’ deaths. Once they recover, Nonnie and Harry accompany him to Ricketts’ mining facility, where they find his hoard of elephant tusks. They rig the place with dynamite and, just as Ricketts arrives, they lead him outside and light the fuse. Ricketts runs back into the mine trying to extinguish the flame, but the dynamite explodes and buries him within the mine.

Sometime later, Nonnie and Harry say goodbye to Xhabbo, who returns to the Kalahari. Harry kisses Nonnie before boarding an aircraft home to New York, and she tells him to leave without looking back. However, as Nonnie and Col. Theron begin cleaning the charred remains of the Parker home, Harry returns, and the youths embrace.

Cast 

 Reese Witherspoon as Nonnie Parker
 Ethan Randall as Harry Winslow 
 Jack Thompson as John Ricketts
 Sarel Bok as Xhabbo 
 Robert John Burke as Paul Parker 
 Patricia Kalember as Elizabeth Parker 
 Daniel Gerroll as John Winslow 
 Maximilian Schell as Col. Mopani Theron 
 Miles Anderson as Jardin
 Taffy Chihota as Warden Robert 
 Magdalene Damas as Nuin-Tara

Production 
Principal photography was in Namibia and Zimbabwe in from May to September 1992. It was the directorial debut of cinematographer Mikael Salomon.

The aircraft featured in A Far Off Place were: 
 Cessna 180G Z-WLK 
 Bell 206B JetRanger III, ZS-HAJ 
 Cessna 421A Golden Eagle, Z-WMB 
 Boeing 707-330B

Reception 
On review aggregator Rotten Tomatoes, the film holds a score of 42% based on reviews from 12 critics, with an average rating of 5 out of 10. Audiences polled by CinemaScore gave the film an average grade of "A-" on an A+ to F scale.

Film critic Roger Ebert criticized the plot and the level of violence. Awarding the film two stars, he singled out the film's premise which requires the characters to cross 2,000 kilometers to find help: "As perhaps the only American film critic who has in fact crossed the Kalahari Desert, twice, I could have saved them a lot of trouble. There were dozens of towns and villages within 100 miles of their starting place, and Cape Town itself would have been less than 2,000 kilometers away". He also noted the film's similarities to the 1971 Australian film Walkabout.

Ebert praised the performances and the photography, the latter which he said "captures the forms of the sand dunes with real poetry". In addition, Ebert positively cited "the scenes where the young Bushman (Sarel Bok) teaches...survival lore, tells [the kids] the legends of his people, and laughs uproariously at their Westernized behavior". He lamented the film's strengths gave way to tired plot conventions and scenes of violence that are arguably above a PG rating.

Film historian and critic Leonard Maltin had mixed reactions to the storyline. He considered the plot "borderline-slow but head-on straight", and said that the "frank treatment of death makes this iffy for young kids, but older children should find it rewarding."

See also
African Cats (2011)
The Last Lions (2011)
Duma (2005)
Cheetah (1989)
Born Free (1966)

References

Bibliography 

 Maltin, Leonard, ed. Leonard Maltin's 2012 Movie Guide. New York: New American Library, 2011 (originally published as TV Movies, then Leonard Maltin’s Movie & Video Guide), First edition 1969, published annually since 1988. .

External links 
 
 
 
 
 

1993 films
1990s adventure drama films
American aviation films
American children's adventure films
Films based on multiple works of a series
Films based on South African novels
Films set in Africa
Films set in deserts
Films shot in Namibia
Films shot in Zimbabwe
Amblin Entertainment films
Walt Disney Pictures films
Films directed by Mikael Salomon
Films scored by James Horner
1993 directorial debut films
1993 drama films
1990s English-language films
1990s American films